987 (formerly known as Perfect Ten 98.7FM before 26 June 2005) is Singapore's first 24-hour English music radio station of Mediacorp Radio in Singapore. It is a 24-hour radio station that plays English language hit songs from Singapore, Australia, United Kingdom, United States, and around the world. 987FM is the sole contemporary hit radio on the FM frequency band in Singapore. 987 was officially launched as Perfect Ten 98.7FM on New Year's Day 1989 at midnight SST as 24-hour music radio station in English. Its studio is current at Mediacorp Campus, Mediapolis. The radio station was slogan: Singapore's Number 1 Hit Music Station.

The programmes on 987 as of 12 May 2022 include The Shock Circuit with Sonia and Joakim on the mornings, The Lunchbox with Natasha and The Halftime Show with Ann Nicole at the lunchtime, The Get Out with Gerald, Kim and Maya in the evenings and The Down Low with Germaine and Avery on overnight.

History

Perfect Ten 98.7FM (1989-2005)
987 was officially launched on New Year's Day 1989 at midnight SST as Perfect Ten 98.7FM with ten DJs, the first 24-hour English radio station in Singapore of Singapore Broadcasting Corporation (SBC). It broadcast from Caldecott Broadcast Centre.

987FM (2005-now) 
Perfect Ten 98.7FM became 987 on 27 June 2005. 987's studio moved out of Caldecott Broadcast Centre on 19 July 2010 and it broadcast from *SCAPE along Orchard Road at 2 Orchard Link for three years. 987 moved back to Caldecott Broadcast Centre on 20 May 2013 after its tenancy with *SCAPE expired. On 17 January 2017, 987 studio moved out of Caldecott Broadcast Centre and into the brand new Mediacorp Campus, Mediapolis @ one-north.

Content

Music
987 adopts the Contemporary Hit Radio format with the majority of the playlist consisting of music from the 2010s along with a minority of hits from the late 2000s.

On New Year's Eve annually there will be a countdown of the year's biggest hits on 987, played out over a 10-hour period with a repeat on New Year's Day.

Awards

Controversies
In May 2007, The Muttons were suspended for a while due to their participation in No Bra Day, an activity that was sponsored by FHM Singapore and featured young models competing to see who could remove their bras in the fastest time possible. A video taken in the studio was posted on YouTube and the resulting uproar from viewers forced the station to pay S$9,800 to the Media Development Authority of Singapore for 'inappropriate and offensive content'. Muttons in the Morning was then replaced with The Dan and Young Show. They soon came back to 987FM in July 2007 for the late night slot show, now called Muttons To Midnight.

In July 2009, Chew Soo Wei, was sacked by the programming director, Daniel Ong, over alleged claims of failing to put on an American accent and issues with proficiency of the English language. Listeners expressed disdain that it was unfair for DJs with local accents to be discriminated while DJs who speak with an American accent receive preferential treatment.

In March 2010, it was announced that Ris Low would be joining the 987 crew and hosting the evening drive-time show. There was a huge outrage among listeners over her unprofessional attitude, including turning up more than 2 hours late for her first radio show and usage of poor English.

In March 2012, Shan Wee left 987 in February 2012, a 'ManHunt' was conducted to find a replacement for Rozz's co-host on the morning show. Listeners were invited to audition for the spot from 12 to 16 March 2012 and were told that they stood a chance of getting a spot on 987. However, it turned out that Rozz's new co-host is Bobby Tonelli from neighbour radio station, Class 95FM. It was speculated that the auditions were a waste of time and effort and simply just an advertising strategy to gain more listenership.

Transmission hours
987 is a 24-hour operating channel.

Slogans
Singapore's Number 1 Hit Music Station (New Year's Day 1989-now)

Frequencies

National anthem
The National anthem plays at 06:00 SST when the station starts transmission. The National anthem plays for few seconds.

Similar contemporary hit radio 
 Hitz

See also
 List of radio stations in Singapore
 Contemporary hit radio

References

External links
 987FM
 
 987FM on Instagram
 987FM on Facebook

Radio stations in Singapore
Contemporary hit radio stations
Radio stations established in 1989
1989 establishments in Singapore